Bagdadia cymoptila is a moth in the family Gelechiidae. It was described by Edward Meyrick in 1929. It is found in southern India.

The wingspan is 10–13 mm. The forewings are grey speckled whitish, more or less tinged yellow brownish posteriorly and with some scattered black scales. There are several raised tufts along the costa, preceded by blackish scales and there are also some black partly raised dots, one on the fold before the middle and one in the disc at two-thirds. The stigmata are sometimes large, two on the dorsum at one-fourth and the middle, one just above the tornus, and one near the termen beneath the apex. The hindwings are subhyaline (almost glass like) pale grey, with the veins and terminal edge suffused dark grey.

References

Moths described in 1929
Bagdadia